Daniel L. Hunt is an American football coach and former player.  He was the head football coach at Colgate University located in the Village of Hamilton in Madison County, New York, and held that position since 2014. Hunt played for Springfield College from 1988 to 1991 and was a two-year starter at tight end. Hunt graduated from Springfield in 1992 with a degree in physical education, and earned his master's degree in athletic administration from Springfield in 1995. He began his coaching career as an assistant at Springfield College before coming to Colgate in 1995. He has coached tight ends, running backs, and quarterbacks during his tenure and he was named associate head coach in 2010. Hunt was named as the 29th head coach at Colgate upon the retirement of Dick Biddle following the 2013 season.

Head coaching record

References

External links
 Colgate profile

Year of birth missing (living people)
Living people
American football tight ends
Colgate Raiders football coaches
Springfield Pride football coaches
Springfield Pride football players
People from Canajoharie, New York